is a Japanese former professional footballer who played as a midfielder.

Career statistics

References

External links

Living people
1985 births
People from Iwamizawa, Hokkaido
Association football people from Hokkaido
Association football midfielders
Japanese footballers
J1 League players
J2 League players
Hokkaido Consadole Sapporo players